The Gaskin Avenue Historic District, in Douglas in Coffee County, Georgia, is a  historic district listed on the National Register of Historic Places in 1993.  It contained 250 contributing buildings and 135 non-contributing ones.

It is roughly bounded by Madison Ave., Wilson St., Pearl Ave., Gordon St., McDonald Ave., the former Atlantic Coast Line Railroad, and Coffee Ave.  The district is mostly residential, including historic houses built from c.1890 into the 1940s.  Several large Queen Anne-style houses are included.  It also includes a Colonial Revival-style Catholic church, a one-story former hospital which in 1993 was in use by the Coffee County Board of Education, and a local women's clubhouse.  The district includes significant landscape architecture as well.

References

External links

Historic districts on the National Register of Historic Places in Georgia (U.S. state)
Queen Anne architecture in Georgia (U.S. state)
Coffee County, Georgia